The Magahi language, also known as Magadhi, is a language spoken in Bihar, Jharkhand and West Bengal states of eastern India, and in the Terai of Nepal. Magadhi Prakrit was the ancestor of Magahi, from which the latter's name derives.

It has a very rich and old tradition of folk songs and stories. It is spoken in nine districts of Bihar (Gaya, Patna, Jehanabad, Aurangabad, Nalanda, Sheikhpura, Nawada, Lakhisarai, Arwal), eight districts of Jharkhand (Hazaribag, Palamu, Chatra, Koderma, Jamtara, Bokaro, Dhanbad, Giridih) and in West Bengal's Malda district. There are around 20,700,000 speakers of Magahi, including speakers 12 million Magahi and 8 million Khortha which is considered a dialect of Magahi.

Magahi derived from the ancient Magadhi Prakrit, which was created in the ancient kingdom of Magadha, the core of which was the area south of the Ganges and east of Son River.

Though the number of speakers in Magahi is about 12.6 million, it has not been constitutionally recognised in India. In Bihar, Hindi is the language used for educational and official matters. Magahi was legally absorbed under Hindi in the 1961 Census.

History

The ancestor of Magahi, Magadhi Prakrit, formed in the Indian subcontinent. These regions were part of the ancient kingdom of Magadha, the core of which was the area of Bihar south of the river Ganga.

The name Magahi is directly derived from the word Magadhi, and many educated speakers of Magahi prefer the name "Magadhi" over Magahi for the modern language.

The development of the Magahi language into its current form is unknown. However, linguists have concluded that Magahi along with Assamese, Bengali, Bhojpuri, Maithili and Oriya originated from the Magadhi Prakrit during the 8th to 11th centuries. These different but sister  dialects differentiated themselves and took their own course of growth and development. But it is not certain when exactly it took place. It was probably such an unidentified period during which modern Indian languages begin to take modern shape. By the end of the 12th century, the development of Apabhramsa reached its climax. Gujarati, Marathi, Bengali, Assamese, Oriya, Maithili and other modern languages took definite shape in their literary writings in the beginning of the 14th century. The distinct shape of Magadhi can be seen in the Dohakosha written by Sarahapa and Kauhapa.

Magadhi had a setback due to the transition period of the Magadha administration. Traditionally, strolling bards recite long epic poems in this dialect, and it was because of this that the word "Magadhi" came to mean "a bard". Devanagari is the most widely used script in present times, while Bengali and Odia scripts are also used in some regions and Magahi's old script was Kaithi script. The pronunciation in Magahi is not as broad as in Maithili and there are a number of verbal forms for each person. Historically, Magahi had no famous written literature. There are many popular songs throughout the area in which the language is spoken, and strolling bards recite various long epic poems which are known more or less over the whole of Northern India. In Magahi speaking area, folk singers sing a good number of ballads. The introduction of Urdu meant a setback to local languages as its Persian script was alien to local people.

The first success in spreading Hindi occurred in Bihar in 1881, when Hindi displaced Urdu as the official language of the province. After independence, Hindi was given the sole official status through the Bihar Official Language Act, 1950 ignoring the state's own languages.

Phonology

Consonants

Vowels 

  may also be heard as lower  in shortened positions.
  may also be heard as lower  in more initial positions.

Speakers of Magahi
There are several dialects of Magahi. It is spoken in the area which formed the core of the ancient kingdom of Magadha - the modern districts of Patna, Nalanda, Gaya, Jehanabad, Arwal, Aurangabad, Lakhisarai, Sheikhpura and Nawada. Magahi is bounded on the north by the various forms of Maithili spoken in Mithila across the Ganga. On the west it is bounded by the Bhojpuri, On the northeast it is bounded by Angika. A blend of Magahi known as Khortha is spoken by non-tribal populace in North Chotanagpur division of Jharkhand which comprises districts of Bokaro, Chatra, Dhanbad, Giridih, Hazaribagh, Koderma and Ramgarh. People of Southern Bihar and Northern Jharkhand are mostly speakers of Magahi. Magahi is also spoken in Malda district of West Bengal. According to 2011 Census, there were approximately 20.7 million Magahi speakers.

See also
Culture of Magadh Region
Culture of Bhojpuri Region
Culture of Mithila Region
Culture of Angika Region
 Pāli, the canonical language of Theravada Buddhism traditionally associated with the language of Magadhi
Phool Bahadur

Notes

References

Further reading

 Munishwar Jha - "Magadhi And Its Formation," Calcutta Sanskrit College Research Series, 1967, 256 pp
 Saryu Prasad - "A Descriptive Study of Magahi Phonology", PhD thesis submitted to Patna University.
 A.C. Sinha (1966) - "Phonology and Morphology of a Magahi Dialect", PhD awarded by the University of Poona.(now Pune)
 G.A. Grierson Essays on Bihari Declension and Conjugation, Journal of the Asiatic Society of Bengal, vol. iii, pp. 119–159
 Hoernle, A.F. Rudolf & Grierson, G.A. A Comparative Dictionary of the Bihari Language
 Prasad, Swarnlata (1959) Juncture and Aitch in Magahi, Indian Linguistics, Turner Jubilee Volume, 1959 pp. 118–124.
 Sweta Sinha (2014) - "The Prosody of Stress and Rhythm in Magahi", PhD thesis submitted to Jawaharlal Nehru University, New Delhi.
 Sweta Sinha (2018)- "Magahi Prosody", Bahri Publications: New Delhi. .

External links

Magahi - A Historical language
Jain Scriptures
Magahi Detailed Description by Grierson, G.A.
Magahī Phonology: A Descriptive Study by Saryoo Prasad

Magahi language
Bihari languages
Eastern Indo-Aryan languages
Languages of Bihar
Languages of Jharkhand
Languages of West Bengal
Languages of Madhesh Province